Jeremy David Fisher, (born June 12, 1974, in Detroit, Michigan) is an American Video Producer and Final Cut Editor.

Fisher won the NATAS Suncoast Emmy Award for Best Sports Editing for 2003's Run Ricky Run and 2005's Emmy Award for Best Series for Living Beyond Breast Cancer and School Insecurity with WFOR-TV in Miami.

References

External links
Official homepage

1974 births
Living people
American television producers
Emmy Award winners
Rutgers University alumni
Businesspeople from Detroit
Businesspeople from Miami